Blithfield Reservoir is a large raw water reservoir in Staffordshire, England, owned by South Staffordshire Water.

Some  800 acres (324 hectares) of reservoir was formed on land sold by Baron Bagot to the South Staffordshire Water Works (SSWW) in the 1940s. Blithfield Reservoir was opened by Queen Elizabeth, The Queen Mother on Tuesday 27 October 1953.
 The Reservoir is located just north-east of the town of Rugeley and just south of Abbots Bromley
The reservoir is a haven for wildlife, particularly birds, a fact that was recognised in 1988 when the reservoir and most of its surrounding woodland was designated as a Site of Special Scientific Interest, (SSSI). Parts of the shoreline and surrounding woodland are only available to birdwatchers under a permit scheme, operated by the West Midland Bird Club, but much of the open water is visible from the road causeway which crosses the reservoir (grid reference SK055235), and there is access to the dam end of the reservoir. There is also an education centre to facilitate visits by school parties.

Blithfield was once a "members only" fly fishing destination, but, in recent years, it has been opened up to day ticket holders. Day tickets are available from the Estate Office.

Blithfield reservoir walks give members of the public the chance to enjoy the area and its wildlife. The reservoir has been visited by many scarce and rare migrant birds, including an inland Arctic warbler (1993), Bonaparte's gull (1994 and 1996), blue-winged teal (1996 and 2000) and squacco heron (2004).

References

Nature reserves in Staffordshire
Drinking water reservoirs in England
Sites of Special Scientific Interest in Staffordshire
Borough of East Staffordshire
Reservoirs in Staffordshire